"You Should Be Sad" (stylized in sentence case) is a song recorded by American singer Halsey. It was released on January 10, 2020, through Capitol Records as the third single from her third studio album, Manic (2020). Halsey wrote the song with their producer Greg Kurstin. "You Should Be Sad" is a country pop ballad that features lyrics about a breakup and an unfaithful ex-lover.

Upon its release, the song was met with critical acclaim, with many critics praising its lyrics. In the US, the song peaked at number twenty six on the Billboard Hot 100, becoming the album's second highest-charting single on the Hot 100. It entered the top ten in Australia, Belgium and Ireland, while reaching the top 20 in Austria, the Czech Republic, Hungary, Scotland, Singapore and the United Kingdom.

The music video for "You Should Be Sad" was directed by Colin Tilley. Premiering on January 10, 2020, the video depicts Halsey going to "an underground country western nightclub, where a lot of beautiful people are line-dancin".  The video was met with mixed reviews.

Background 
Halsey revealed that she wrote the song in her living room floor, as well in Nashville, and stated that "the most petty and heartbreaking songs all come from country". When talking about the inspiration for the outfits, Halsey confirmed a number of artists, writing, "Xtina, Gaga, Carrie, and of course Shania, this was one loaded with nods to badass idols of mine. Had the vision to do a 'Before He Cheats' but instead about after he does haha".

Composition 
Musically, "You Should Be Sad" is a three minutes and twenty-five seconds acoustic-driven country pop ballad. In terms of music notation, "You Should Be Sad" was composed using  common time in the key of B minor, with a tempo of 120 beats per minute. The song follows the chord progression of Bm-G-D-F#m/D-G-D-A. Halsey's vocal range spans from the low note A3 to the high note of E5, giving the song two octaves and four notes of range.

Lyrically, "You Should Be Sad" is a breakup song about an unfaithful ex-lover.

Critical reception 
Tom Breihan from Stereogum described the song as a "big, pissed-off ballad directed at an ex", while speculating G-Eazy as the subject of the track. Writing for Vulture, Bethy Squires called the song a "devastating song to do for karaoke in front of an ex". Kaitlin Reilly of Refinery29 wrote that the track was a "country breakup song" that lyrically "holds nothing back, guaranteeing the song a place on every post-breakup playlist". Micheal Love Michael from Paper Magazine praised Halsey for being "brave enough to write about it in public", and felt that the lyrics were about "a toxic lover that [Halsey] escaped from". Aidan Cullen from Billboard wrote about how the song plays on "country-western motifs to bring rootsy weight to Halsey's verbal revenge". Cullen continued with the Tiësto remix of the song, and wrote that the remix "turns up [her] twang with an ampilified bpm and a big-room blast of a hook" and called the remix a "great warm-up" to Halsey's Manic Tour.

Commercial performance 
The song peaked at number 26 on the Billboard Hot 100, and reached the top 20 on the record charts of several countries, including Australia, Austria, Czech Republic, Denmark, Hungary, Ireland, and Scotland. On the first week of the song's release, the song was played 1,692 times on the Mediabase pop radio. On the week of January 19, 2020, the song was played 4,691 times, reaching number 18 on the Mediabase pop chart. With 997,990 daily streams in the US, the song reached number 10 on the US Spotify Streaming Chart on January 21, 2020.

Music video 
A music video for the song was released alongside the track on January 10, 2020. The video was directed by Colin Tilley. The video depicts Halsey going to "an underground country western nightclub, where a lot of beautiful people are line-dancin". The video makes references to several artists such as Lady Gaga, Shania Twain, Carrie Underwood and Christina Aguilera.

Critical reception
Upon release, the video received mixed reviews. Tom Breiham of Stereogum called the video "completely ridiculous" though he praised the homage to Shania Twain's "That Don't Impress Me Much". Stephen Daw of Billboard was more positive in his review, praising the pop culture references to Twain and Lady Gaga's American Horror Story: Hotel character, The Countess. In an interview with Billboard on the red carpet of the 62nd Annual Grammy Awards, Shania Twain commented on the styles that "channels some of Twain's iconic fashion looks", stating that it made her "warm and fuzzy" and felt "flattered", in addition to being "excited to know that [she was] on the minds of the young artists coming up who appreciated what [she] was doing at the time".

Other performers 

For the Season 13 finale of RuPaul's Drag Race, Utica Queen performed the song as a lipsync, dressed in a black bodysuit and cowboy hat while tied up and surrounded by string. In the video, Utica uses scissors to dramatically cut the strings around her as she lipsyncs.

Track listing 

Digital download / streaming
 "You Should Be Sad" – 3:25

Digital download / streaming – Tiësto remix
 "You Should Be Sad" (Tiësto remix) – 2:25

Digital download / streaming – Acoustic
 "You Should Be Sad" (Acoustic) – 3:18

Digital download / streaming – Remixes
 "You Should Be Sad" (Mike Mago remix) – 3:26
 "You Should Be Sad" (Tiësto remix) – 2:25

Charts

Weekly charts

Year-end charts

Certifications

Release history

References

2020s ballads
2020 singles
2020 songs
American country music songs
Country ballads
Halsey (singer) songs
Music videos directed by Colin Tilley
Pop ballads
Song recordings produced by Greg Kurstin
Songs written by Greg Kurstin
Songs written by Halsey (singer)
Capitol Records singles
EMI Records singles
Songs about infidelity